The labia minora (Latin for 'smaller lips', singular: labium minus), also known as the inner labia, inner lips, vaginal lips or nymphae are two flaps of skin that are part of the human vulva, extending outwards from the vaginal and urethral openings to encompass the vestibule. These labia are situated between the labia majora ('larger lips'). The labia minora vary widely in size, color and shape from individual to individual.

The labia minora are homologous to the male urethral surface of the penis.

Structure and functioning
The labia minora extend from the clitoris obliquely downward, laterally, and backward on either side of the vulval vestibule, ending between the bottom of the vulval vestibule and the labia majora. The posterior ends (bottom) of the labia minora are usually joined across the middle line by a flap of skin, named the frenulum of labia minora or fourchette.

On the front, each lip forks dividing into two portions surrounding the clitoris. The upper part of each lip passes above the clitoris to meet the upper part of the other lip—which will often be a little larger or smaller—forming a fold which overhangs the glans clitoridis (clitoral tip or head); this fold is named the clitoral hood. The lower part passes beneath the glans clitoridis and becomes united to its under surface, forming, with the inner lip of the opposite side, the frenulum clitoridis.

The clitoral hood, analogously to the foreskin of the penis in men and also termed, like the latter, by the Latin word prepuce, serves to cover most of the time the shaft and sometimes the glans (which is very sensitive to the touch) to protect the clitoris from mechanical irritation and from dryness. Yet the hood is movable and can slide during clitoral erection or be pulled upwards a little for greater exposure of the clitoris to sexual stimulation.

The frenulum (Latin for little bridle) is an elastic band of tissue attached by its one end to the clitoral shaft and glans and by its other end to the prepuce. It allows two-way shifting of the clitoral hood: firstly, it can extend to let the hood be moved upwards to expose the glans for stimulation or hygienic cleansing, and secondly, it contracts to pull the hood back to protect it.

Histology
On the opposed surfaces of the labia minora are numerous sebaceous glands not associated with hair follicles. They are lined by stratified squamous epithelium on those surfaces.

Like the whole area of the vulval vestibule, the mucus secreted by those glands protects the labia from dryness and mechanical irritation.

Variation

Being thinner than the outer labia, the inner labia can be also more narrow than the former, or wider than labia majora, thus protruding in the pudendal cleft and making the term minora (Latin for smaller) essentially inapplicable in these cases. They can also be smooth or frilled, the latter being more typical of longer or wider inner labia.

From 2003 to 2004, researchers from the Department of Gynaecology, Elizabeth Garret Anderson Hospital in London, measured the labia and other genital structures of 50 women from the age of 18 to 50, with a mean age of 35.6. The study has since been criticized for its "small and homogenous sample group" consisting primarily of white women. The results were:

Due to the frequent portrayal of the pudendal cleft without protrusion in art and pornography, there has been a rise in the popularity of labiaplasty, surgery to alter the labia—usually, to make them smaller. On the other hand, there is an opposite movement of labia stretching. Its proponents stress the beauty of long labia and their positive role in sexual stimulation of both partners.

Labiaplasty is also sometimes sought by women who have asymmetrical labia minora to adjust the shape of the structures towards identical size.

Labia stretching has traditionally been practised in some African nations in the East and South and the South Pacific.

Functioning 
The inner lips serve to protect from mechanical irritation, dryness and infections of the highly sensitive area of the vulval vestibule with vaginal and urethral openings in it between them. During vaginal sexual intercourse they may contribute to stimulation of the whole vestibule area, the clitoris and the vagina of the woman and the penis of her partner. Stimulation of the clitoris may occur through tension of the clitoral hood and its frenulum by inner labia pulling at them. During sexual arousal they are lubricated by the mucus secreted in the vagina and around it to make penetration painless and protect them from irritation.

As the female external urethral opening (meatus) is also situated between labia minora, they may play a role in guiding the stream of the urine during female urination.

Medical conditions 
Being very sensitive by their structure to any irritation, and situated in the excretion area where traces of urine, vaginal discharge, smegma and even feces may be present, the inner lips may be susceptible to inflammatory infections of the vulva such as vulvitis.

The likelihood of inflammation may be reduced through appropriate regular hygienic cleansing of the whole vulval vestibule, using water and medically tested cleansing agents designed for vulvas. To avoid contamination of the vulva with fecal bacteria, it is recommended that the vulva is washed only from front to back, from mons pubis to the perineum and anus. Apart from water and special liquid cleansing agents (lotions), there are commercially available wet wipes for female intimate hygiene. Some women wipe the vulval vestibule dry with toilet tissue after urination to avoid irritation and infections from residual drops of the urine in the area.

However, incorrect choice of cleansing agents, or their incorrect application, may itself cause labial irritation and require medical attention. Over-vigorous rubbing of the labia of little girls while washing, combined with the lack of estrogen in their bodies, may lead to the mostly pediatric condition known as labial fusion. If fused labia prevent urination, urine may accumulate and cause pain and inflammation.

In adult females, irritation of the area may be caused by wearing too-tight underwear (especially where wider inner labia protrude in the pudendal cleft); while G-strings, which rub against the labia during body movements, may cause irritation or lead to infection from bacteria transferred from either the external environment or the anus.

Additional images

See also 

 Femalia
 Labia pride
 Labia stretching
 Labiaplasty

References

External links

Mammal female reproductive system

sn:Hwabvu hutete
de:Schamlippe#Die kleinen (inneren) Schamlippen
pl:Wargi sromowe mniejsze